Pedro Montoliú Camps (born 1954) is a Spanish journalist who was named a  in 1999.

Biography
Pedro Montoliú was born in Madrid in 1954. He earned a licentiate in journalism at the Complutense University of Madrid's Faculty of Information Sciences in 1976. That year he became a founding editor of El País, a newspaper where he worked for fifteen years as a municipal chronicler and deputy local news chief.

After directing the magazine La Esfera, the Ministry of Territorial Policy of the Community of Madrid's Department of Communication, and his own communication company, Montoliú was put in charge of the Madrid local supplement for the newspaper La Vanguardia. In 2001, he founded and began directing , the first digital portal dedicated to Madrid news, a position he currently holds.

A lecturer, commentator on local issues for various stations, and columnist for publications including ABC and La Vanguardia, Montoliú has received the Mesonero Romanos Journalism Award from the City Council of Madrid (1985) and the Chamber of Commerce and Industry Award of Madrid (1988). He has been a juror for the Antonio Maura Research Award and the Mesonero Romanos Award, convened by the Madrid City Council, and the Río Manzanares Novel Award, convened by the Municipal Land and Housing Company. He also chairs the jury of the Madrid Awards granted by Madridiario.

In 1999, the Plenary Session of the City Council of Madrid appointed him .

Montoliú has combined his professional work with the study of the history of Madrid. He co-authored the book Palace Hotel, Madrid (with two editions, in 1999 and 2009), and was coordinator of the Madrid Fair Institution's Best of Madrid guide for the years 1996, 1997, and 1998. In 2002, he published his first novel, La memoria de cristal.

Awards
 1985: Mesonero Romanos Journalism Award from the City Council of Madrid
 1988: Chamber of Commerce and Industry Award of Madrid
 2009: Francos Rodríguez Award from the

Works
 Once siglos de mercado madrileño (1985), in three editions, with prologues by mayors Enrique Tierno Galván, Juan Barranco Gallardo, and Agustín Rodríguez Sahagún
 Madrid Villa y Corte (1987), work comprising three volumes, with prologue by Julio Caro Baroja
 Madrid, Villa y Corte. Historia de una ciudad (1996), revised and expanded edition of Volume 1
 Madrid, Villa y Corte. Calles y plazas (2002), revised and expanded edition of Volume 2
 El ayer, hoy y mañana de las ferias de Madrid (1990), 
 Fiestas y tradiciones madrileñas (1990), with prologue by Francisco Nieva
 Once siglos de mercado madrileño: de la plaza de la Paja a Mercamadrid (1991), 
 Madrid 1900 (1994), prologue by 
 Madrid en la Guerra Civil. Vol. 1, La historia (1998), 
 Madrid en la guerra civil. Los protagonistas (1999), 
 Palace Hotel, Madrid (1999), 
 Enciclopedia de Madrid (2002), 
 La memoria de cristal (2002), 
 Madrid en la posguerra. 1939–1946. Los años de la represión (2005), 
 Madrid bajo la dictadura 1947–1959 (2010), 
 Héroes, pícaros y soñadores : la historia de Madrid para los más jóvenes (2015), 
 De la dictadura a la democracia : protagonistas (2018),

References

External links

 Articles by Pedro Montoliú at Madridiario

1954 births
20th-century Spanish journalists
21st-century Spanish male writers
Complutense University of Madrid alumni
El País editors
Living people
Writers from Madrid